3,4-Methylenedioxyphenylpropan-2-one or piperonyl methyl ketone (MDP2P or PMK) is a chemical compound consisting of a phenylacetone moiety substituted with a methylenedioxy functional group. It is commonly synthesized from either safrole (which, for comparison, is 3-[3,4-(methylenedioxy)phenyl]-2-propene) or its isomer isosafrole via oxidation using the Wacker oxidation or peroxyacid oxidation methods. MDP2P is unstable at room temperature and must be kept in the freezer in order to be preserved properly.

MDP2P is a precursor in the chemical synthesis of the methylenedioxyphenethylamine (MDxx) class of compounds, the classic example of which is 3,4-methylenedioxy-N-methylamphetamine (MDMA), and is also an intermediate between the MDxx family and their slightly more distant precursor safrole or isosafrole. On account of its relation to the MDxx chemical class, MDP2P, as well as safrole and isosafrole, are in the United States (U.S.) Drug Enforcement Administration (DEA) List I of Chemicals of the Controlled Substances Act (CSA) via the Chemical Diversion and Trafficking Act (CDTA). It is also considered a category 1 precursor in the European Union.

See also 
 Isosafrole
 Phenylacetone
 Safrole

References 

Ketones
Benzodioxoles